Joshua Eli Gomez (born November 20, 1975) is an American actor best known for his role as Morgan Grimes on Chuck.

Career
He is the younger brother of actor Rick Gomez. Gomez appeared in a recurring role in the CBS series Without a Trace as computer tech James Mackeroy. He appeared in a series of IBM commercials, a series of Wendy's commercials (Ranch Tooth), and a commercial for Garmin. He also made a cameo on Freddy's Nightmares. He played Sammy Stinger in Bring It On Again, 2004.

As a voice actor, Gomez played Baralai in the video game Final Fantasy X-2, opposite his brother Rick's character, Gippal, and as Parker in Turok. He also had a small part at the beginning of BioShock as Johnny. In September 2007, he began starring in the NBC series Chuck as the title character's friend, Morgan Grimes. Gomez is friends with Chuck co-star Zachary Levi in real life. Joshua was nominated for Outstanding Male Performance in the Comedy Television Series at the 2008 ALMA Awards.

Filmography

Film

Television

Video games

References

External links

 
 
 

1975 births
Living people
American male film actors
American male television actors
American male video game actors
American male voice actors
Male actors from New Jersey
Actors from Bayonne, New Jersey
21st-century American male actors
Hispanic and Latino American male actors